This is a list of seasons by the Barangay Ginebra San Miguel of the Philippine Basketball Association.

1975-2003
*One-game playoff**Team had twice-to-beat advantage

2004-2010
*one-game playoffs

2010-present
*one-game playoffs**team had the twice-to-beat advantage

Per season records

Cumulative records